Souk Lakhmis Dades or Khemis Dades is a commune in the Ouarzazate Province of the Souss-Massa-Drâa administrative region of Morocco. At the time of the 2004 census, the commune had a total population of 16387 people living in 2400 households.

Khemis Dades is a locality takes its name from the day of the souk, Thursday (“Khemis” in Berber and Arabic), as well as from the Dades Valley. The commune consists of several villages or douars. Each village bears the name of the tribe that lives there, such as:

 Ait Boulemane
 Ait Bouhrrou
 Ait Alouane
 Ait Boubker
 Tansgharte

Infrastructure 
Khemis Dades has a post office, a dispensary, several primary schools and several high schools/secondary schools, including "Sidi Bouyahia", " Abd el Karim el Khatabi", "Ait Uzin", and "Zawit el Biaar". 15042 people live in Souk el Khemis Dades as of 12 October 2018.

Festivals 
The Festival of Me goun Dadès is organized annually and comprises subjects relative to various sets of themes, like film, artistic evenings and other sporting and cultural programs.

References

Populated places in Ouarzazate Province
Rural communes of Drâa-Tafilalet